St. Alban's is a town of approximately 1,200 located in the Bay d'Espoir estuary on the south coast of Newfoundland, Canada. St. Alban's is the largest community in Bay d'Espoir.

St. Alban's is regarded as a hub for the aquaculture industry and the Newfoundland Aquaculture Industry Association (NAIA) maintains an office in the town.

Heritage and history 
The economy in both town and area has historically been based on trading and logging when first settled in the mid-1800s, then named Ship Cove, with name changed to Saint Alban's in 1915 and in 1964, St. Alban's became incorporated as a town.  Today the major town and area industries include hydro generation and aquaculture. The town consists of 1,189 residents and is the largest in Bay d'Espoir area.

St. Alban's and area has emerged as the centre for the growing aquaculture industry and hydro generation remains an integral part of the area's economy. The town is home to an Aquaculture Development Centre and Aquatic Fish Health Laboratory, a 58,000 square foot fish hatchery, aquaculture manufacturing and service firms, processing plant, and many offices associated with the foregoing. The aquaculture industry in the town and area in 2013 exceeded a production value of $200 million (nearly 20% of the total value of the seafood industry of Newfoundland and Labrador).

The Hydro Generation Site in the area is the largest on the island of Newfoundland and provides 2,650 GWh annually.  The seven generating units produce a rated output of 604 MW.  Both industries are very predominate to the local economy.

Hurricane Matthew 
St. Alban's, along with much of the island of Newfoundland, was gravely affected by Hurricane Matthew in October 2016. Road access to the town was temporarily cut off by flooding washing away the main bridge. The nearby town of Conne River provided boat rides into the community while the road was being repaired.

Demographics 

Notable people
 Minnie White, accordionist
 Ross Snook, darts player

See also
 Bay d'Espoir Academy
 Bay d'Espoir Hydroelectric Power Station

References

Populated coastal places in Canada
Towns in Newfoundland and Labrador